{{DISPLAYTITLE:C12H8}}
The molecular formula C12H8 (molar mass: 152.19 g/mol, exact mass: 152.0626 u) may refer to:

 Acenaphthylene, a polycyclic aromatic hydrocarbon
 Biphenylene, an alternant, polycyclic hydrocarbon